Avonte Maddox (born March 31, 1996) is an American football cornerback for the Philadelphia Eagles of the National Football League (NFL). He played college football at Pittsburgh.

Early career 
After playing little league football, Maddox focused on baseball his first two years of high school before switching to football. He received only two Power Five scholarship offers, one from Purdue and one from Pittsburgh. He was also nearly drafted into the MLB after his senior year of high school.

College career 
Maddox started at cornerback all four years at Pitt. He was named Honorable Mention All-Atlantic Coast Conference his sophomore year and Third-team his senior year. Maddox missed two games in both his junior and senior years due to injury.

Collegiate statistics

Professional career 

Maddox was drafted by the Philadelphia Eagles in the fourth round (125th overall) in the 2018 NFL Draft. He made his NFL debut during the league season opener on September 6, 2018 against the Atlanta Falcons, playing on special teams. Maddox recorded his first career interception by picking off a pass from Tennessee Titans quarterback Marcus Mariota in the 26–23 overtime loss on September 30. He recorded his second interception of the season off of Jared Goff during the 30-27 win against the Rams.

On September 26, 2019, late in a game between the Eagles and the Green Bay Packers, Maddox collided helmets with teammate Andrew Sendejo on an attempted tackle of Jamaal Williams and had to be carted off the field on a stretcher. The Eagles announced that Maddox had movement in all of his extremities, but was taken to a local hospital overnight as a precaution and for further evaluation, returning with the team the next day.

During the Eagles week 3 game against the Bengals, Maddox suffered an injury which ultimately forced him to miss the next three games before being activated on week 7. On December 18, 2020, Maddox was placed on season-ending injured reserve after an injury sustained during their week 14 game against the Saints. He finished the season with 40 tackles and three pass deflections through 10 games and eight starts.

Starting his last season on his rookie contract in 2021, Maddox began the season by leading the Eagles in tackles (with 9) during their 32-6 win against the Falcons. On October 24 against the Raiders, Maddox recorded his third career interception during the 33-22 loss. On November 20, 2021, Maddox signed a three-year, $22.5 million contract extension with the Eagles. He was placed on the COVID list on January 3, 2022. He was activated one week later on January 10, missing just one game where the Eagles did not play their starters.

Maddox returned as a starter in 2022 as the team's primary nickelback. He was placed on injured reserve on November 14, 2022 with a hamstring injury. He was activated on December 10. Maddox reached Super Bowl LVII where the Eagles lost 38-35 to the Kansas City Chiefs. Maddox recorded 7 tackles in the Super Bowl.

NFL career statistics

References

External links
Philadelphia Eagles bio
Pittsburgh Panthers bio

1996 births
Living people
American football cornerbacks
Philadelphia Eagles players
Pittsburgh Panthers football players
Players of American football from Detroit
Martin Luther King High School (Detroit) alumni